Beyram (also Romanized as Beyrām; also known as Bahrām) is a village in Kani Bazar Rural District, Khalifan District, Mahabad County, West Azerbaijan Province, Iran. At the 2006 census, its population was 292, in 41 families.

References 

Populated places in Mahabad County